Xyphosia laticauda is a species of tephritid or fruit flies in the genus Xyphosia of the family Tephritidae.

Distribution
France, Switzerland, Austria, Hungary, Ukraine, Armenia.

References

Tephritinae
Insects described in 1826
Diptera of Europe